The 1977–78 Cupa României was the 40th edition of Romania's most prestigious football cup competition.

The title was won by Universitatea Craiova against Olimpia Satu Mare.

Format
The competition is an annual knockout tournament.

First round proper matches are played on the ground of the lowest ranked team, then from the second round proper the matches are played on a neutral location.

In the first round proper, if a match is drawn after 90 minutes, the game goes in extra time, if the scored is still tight after 120 minutes, the team who played away will qualify, if the teams are from the same league, then the winner will be established at penalty kicks.

From the second round proper, if a match is drawn after 90 minutes, the game goes in extra time, if the scored is still tight after 120 minutes, then the winner will be established at penalty kicks.

From the first edition, the teams from Divizia A entered in competition in sixteen finals, rule which remained till today.

First round proper

|colspan=3 style="background-color:#FFCCCC;"|19 February 1978

Second round proper

|colspan=3 style="background-color:#FFCCCC;"|19 April 1978

Quarter-finals

|colspan=3 style="background-color:#FFCCCC;"|24 May 1978

Semi-finals

|colspan=3 style="background-color:#FFCCCC;"|18 June 1978

Final

References

External links
 romaniansoccer.ro
 Official site
 The Romanian Cup on the FRF's official site

Cupa României seasons
1977–78 in Romanian football
Romania